Envy is an emotion that is also one of the seven deadly sins.

Envy may also refer to:

Places
Envy, Switzerland
Envy, United States Virgin Islands
 The ICAO code for Værøy Airport, a currently disused airport formerly serving Værøy

Books
Envy (novel) (Zavist'), a 1927 novel by Yuri Olesha
Envy, a Fullmetal Alchemist character

Films
Envy (2004 film), an American comedy film
Envy (2009 film), a Turkish drama film

Music
Envy (English rapper) (born 1987)
Envy (band), a Japanese post-hardcore band
DJ Envy (born 1977), an American DJ and radio personality
Nico & Vinz or Envy, a Norwegian hip-hop duo
 Envy, American band consisting of Rhonni and Gina Stile

Albums
Envy (Eve's Plum album) (1993)
Envy (Ambitious Lovers album) (1984)

Songs
"Envy" (song), a song by Ash
"Envy", a song appearing on Lunch. Drunk. Love. by Bowling For Soup
"Envy" (movie theme song), a movie theme by Dan Navarro, from the 2004 film Envy

Other uses
Envy (apple), a trademarked brand of the Scilate apple variety, a cross between Royal Gala and Braeburn
Envy (dinghy), a type of fibreglass sailing dinghy
HP Envy, a line of laptops by Hewlett-Packard
Team Envy or Team EnVyUs, an international eSports organization based in the United States
VIA Envy, a sound chip